In ecology, the term productivity refers to the rate of generation of biomass in an ecosystem, usually expressed in units of mass per volume (unit surface) per unit of time, such as grams per square metre per day (g m−2 d−1). The unit of mass can relate to dry matter or to the mass of generated carbon. The productivity of autotrophs, such as plants, is called primary productivity, while the productivity of heterotrophs, such as animals, is called secondary productivity.

Primary production

Primary production is the synthesis of organic material from inorganic molecules.  Primary production in most ecosystems is dominated by the process of photosynthesis, In which organisms synthesize organic molecules from sunlight, H2O, and CO2. Primary production is sometimes broken down into Net Primary Production (NPP) and Gross Primary Production (GPP). Gross primary production measures all carbon assimilated into organic molecules by primary producers. Net primary production measures the organic molecules by primary producers. Net primary production also measures the amount of carbon assimilated into organic molecules by primary producers, but does not include organic molecules that are then broken down again by these organism for biological processes such as cellular respiration.

Primary producers

Photoautotrophs 
Organisms that rely on light energy to fix carbon, and thus participate in primary production, are referred to as photoautotrophs.

Photoautotrophs exists across the tree of life. Many bacterial taxa are known to be photoautotrophic such as cyanobacteria and some Pseudomonadota (formerly proteobacteria). Eukaryotic organisms gained the ability to participate in photosynthesis through the development of plastids derived from endosymbiotic relationships. Archaeplastida, which includes red algae, green algae, and plants, have evolved chloroplasts originating from an ancient endosymbiotic relationship with an Alphaproteobacteria. The productivity of plants, while being photoautotrophs, is also dependent on factors such as salinity and abiotic stressors from the surrounding environment. The rest of the eukaryotic photoautotrophic organisms are within the SAR clade (Comprising Stramenopila, Alveolata, and Rhizaria). Organisms in the SAR clade that developed plastids did so through a secondary or a tertiary endosymbiotic relationships with green algae and/or red algae. The SAR clade includes many aquatic and marine primary producers such as Kelp, Diatoms, and Dinoflagellates.

Lithoautotrophs 
The other process of primary production is lithoautotrophy. Lithoautotrophs use reduced chemical compounds such as hydrogen gas, hydrogen sulfide, methane, or ferrous ion to fix carbon and participate in primary production. Lithoautotrophic organisms are prokaryotic and are represented by members of both the bacterial and archaeal domains.  Lithoautotrophy is the only form of primary production possible in ecosystems without light such as ground-water ecosystems, hydrothermal vent ecosystems, soil ecosystems, and cave ecosystems.

Secondary production
Secondary production is the generation of biomass of heterotrophic (consumer) organisms in a system.  This is driven by the transfer of organic material between trophic levels, and represents the quantity of new tissue created through the use of assimilated food.  Secondary production is sometimes defined to only include consumption of primary producers by herbivorous consumers (with tertiary production referring to carnivorous consumers), but is more commonly defined to include all biomass generation by heterotrophs.

Organisms responsible for secondary production include animals, protists, fungi and many bacteria.

Secondary production can be estimated through a number of different methods including increment summation, removal summation, the instantaneous growth method and the Allen curve method. The choice between these methods will depend on the assumptions of each and the ecosystem under study.  For instance, whether cohorts should be distinguished, whether linear mortality can be assumed and whether population growth is exponential.

Productivity
Following is the list of ecosystems in order of decreasing productivity.

See also
 Biomass (ecology)
 Community ecology
 Food web
 Agricultural productivity

References

Aquatic ecology
Biological oceanography
Chemical oceanography